Phantastik-Preis der Stadt Wetzlar is a literary prize of Hesse.

Winners 

Literary awards of Hesse
Fantasy awards
German literary awards
C